Perilasius brunneus is a species of beetle in the family Cerambycidae. It was described by Franz in 1954.

References

Hesperophanini
Beetles described in 1954